In mathematics, the term socle has several related meanings.

Socle of a group
In the context of group theory, the socle of a group G, denoted soc(G), is the subgroup generated by the minimal normal subgroups of G. It can happen that a group has no minimal non-trivial normal subgroup (that is, every non-trivial normal subgroup properly contains another such subgroup) and in that case the socle is defined to be the subgroup generated by the identity. The socle is a direct product of minimal normal subgroups.

As an example, consider the cyclic group Z12 with generator u, which has two minimal normal subgroups, one generated by u4 (which gives a normal subgroup with 3 elements) and the other by u6 (which gives a normal subgroup with 2 elements). Thus the socle of Z12 is the group generated by u4 and u6, which is just the group generated by u2.

The socle is a characteristic subgroup, and hence a normal subgroup. It is not necessarily transitively normal, however.

If a group G is a finite solvable group, then the socle can be expressed as a product of elementary abelian p-groups. Thus, in this case, it is just a product of copies of Z/pZ for various p, where the same p may occur multiple times in the product.

Socle of a module
In the context of module theory and ring theory the socle of a module M over a ring R is defined to be the sum of the minimal nonzero submodules of M. It can be considered as a dual notion to that of the radical of a module. In set notation,

Equivalently,

The socle of a ring R can refer to one of two sets in the ring. Considering R as a right R-module, soc(RR) is defined, and considering R as a left R-module, soc(RR) is defined. Both of these socles are ring ideals, and it is known they are not necessarily equal.

 If M is an Artinian module, soc(M) is itself an essential submodule of M.
 A module is semisimple if and only if soc(M) = M.  Rings for which soc(M) = M for all M are precisely semisimple rings.
 soc(soc(M)) = soc(M). 
M is a finitely cogenerated module if and only if soc(M) is finitely generated and soc(M) is an essential submodule of M.
Since the sum of semisimple modules is semisimple, the socle of a module could also be defined as the unique maximal semisimple submodule.
 From the definition of rad(R), it is easy to see that rad(R) annihilates soc(R). If R is a finite-dimensional unital algebra and M a finitely generated R-module then the socle consists precisely of the elements annihilated by the Jacobson radical of R.

Socle of a Lie algebra
In the context of Lie algebras, a socle of a symmetric Lie algebra is the eigenspace of its structural automorphism that corresponds to the eigenvalue −1. (A symmetric Lie algebra decomposes into the direct sum of its socle and cosocle.)

See also
Injective hull
Radical of a module
Cosocle

References

 
 

Module theory
Group theory
Functional subgroups